Nora the Piano Cat (born September 10, 2004) is a gray tabby cat, rescued from the streets of Camden, New Jersey, by the Furrever Friends animal shelter. Nora gained international prominence after a YouTube video of her playing the piano went viral in 2007. The Times of London, in its online edition, characterized her music as being "something halfway between Philip Glass and free jazz".

Life and music
Nora was adopted as a kitten by artists and musicians, Burnell Yow! and Betsy Alexander of the Fitler Square area of Center City Philadelphia, Pennsylvania, United States. She was given the name Nora after the surrealist artist Leonora Carrington. When she was a year old, Nora climbed up onto the bench in front of a Yamaha Disklavier piano and began to play.

Since that time, Nora has continued to play the piano on a daily basis, sometimes playing duets with Betsy, who is a music teacher, or with Betsy's students. It was the students who encouraged the creation of a YouTube video, which was uploaded in January 2007. It received a large number of views and attracted the attention of other media. It was featured on many talk shows, newspapers and news channels including Martha Stewart, CNN, The Daily Show, Public Radio International, The Today Show and The Philadelphia Inquirer.  Nora was featured on the syndicated television show, Wild About Animals, episode #332, in September 2010.

Nora has attracted the interest of both musicians and scientists, who are fascinated by her rare behavior. It appears that she likes the attention it brings her, but she also plays when alone. She does express a preference for playing with students, when they play Bach, and for playing a specific piano, a Yamaha Disklavier. In addition, she gravitates toward the D-E-F range on the keyboard and includes the black keys in her playing.

The National Science Foundation has included Nora in a video about animal behavior which was shown in museums in the fall of 2007. Pianist Magazine, based in London, featured her in an article,
and a video of her playing was used at the 2007 National Conference of Keyboard Pedagogy. Dean Santomieri, an avant-garde musician from San Francisco, used a loop of Nora's playing in an improvised group performance in July 2007. A dance student at a college in Leeds, England gave a solo performance using Nora's music. Betsy Alexander has written a composition called Fur Release: A Prelude for Paws and Hands, incorporating Nora's music. A CD of music with one song incorporating Nora's playing has been released by the Laurel Canyon Animal Company.

See also 
Zoomusicology
Mindaugas Piečaitis
List of individual cats

References

Further reading

External links 
Nora's Original YouTube performance
Nora YouTube sequel
Nora's owner's website
Dean Santomieri website
Chamber piece composed for Nora by famous Lithuanian composer Mindaugas Piečaitis (catcerto)

2004 animal births
21st-century pianists
Camden County, New Jersey
Individual cats in the United States
Zoomusicology